The Spor Toto Cup was a league cup in Turkey. The competition ran from 1964 to 1971 and 2012.

Champions

Performance by club

References

Links 
 Spor Toto Cup in soccerway

Defunct football cup competitions in Turkey
Recurring sporting events established in 1965
1965 establishments in Turkey
National association football league cups
Recurring sporting events disestablished in 1971
1971 disestablishments in Turkey